General McIntosh may refer to:

James M. McIntosh (1828–1862), Confederate States Army brigadier general
John Baillie McIntosh (1829–1888), Union Army brigadier general
Lachlan McIntosh (1725–1806), Continental Army brigadier general
Robert A. McIntosh (born 1943), U.S. Air Force major general